Kalimera Ellada is a television morning program aired by ANT1 on 28 April 1992 until 1 July 2011 and revived on 7 September 2015 and hosted by Giorgos Papadakis. Contents of the program, which is very famous in its country, includes country and local news, daily presentation of newspaper's frontpages, etc.

See also
List of programs broadcast by ANT1

References

ANT1 original programming
Greek television news shows
1992 Greek television series debuts
2011 Greek television series endings
2015 Greek television series debuts
1990s Greek television series
2000s Greek television series
2010s Greek television series
Greek-language television shows